The Torotoroka scops owl (Otus rutilus madagascariensis) is a subspecies of owl in the family Strigidae. It is endemic to the western parts of Madagascar, and was previously regarded as its own species. However, O. madagascariensis and the rainforest scops owl Otus rutilus have now been re-lumped following Fuchs et al. (2007) as the Madagascar scops owl or Malagasy scops owl. Therefore this taxon now becomes a subspecies, Otus rutilus madagascariensis.

Description
It is very similar to the rainforest scops owl Otus rutilus, and possibly indistinguishable from it. The two were formerly identified by different habitat preferences, with Torotoroka preferring drier habitats and Rainforest preferring wetter forests. Some small plumage and vocal differences were noted but minimal genetic divergence was found. Therefore, Clements has merged the two species.

Distribution and habitat
This taxon is endemic to the western parts of Madagascar.

Its natural habitat is subtropical or tropical dry forests, as well as man-made habitats such as parks, up to 2000m above sea level.

Taxonomy
The Torotoroka scops owl, the Mayotte scops owl Otus mayottensis, the Pemba scops owl Otus pembaensis and the rainforest scops owl Otus rutilus have all previously been lumped as one species.  The taxonomy is in a state of flux but recent genetic studies have placed the Pemba scops owl closer to the clade containing the African scops owl Otus sengalensis, while the Mayotte scops owl is clearly separate from the remaining two.  The status of the rainforest and Torotoroka scops owls as separate species is debatable as there is very little genetic distance between the two taxa and subsequent studies have suggested that the plumage differences between O. rutilus and O. madagascariensis are small and that their voices intergrade. Therefore the rainforest and Torotoroka scops owls become subspecies under the new name Madagascar scops owl, taking the scientific name Otus rutilus.

References

Torotoroka scops owl
Endemic birds of Madagascar
Owls of Madagascar
Torotoroka scops owl
Taxonomy articles created by Polbot
Taxobox binomials not recognized by IUCN